Round Lake is a  lake located on Vancouver Island north  of east end of Great Central Lake.

References

Alberni Valley
Lakes of Vancouver Island
Alberni Land District